Brian Reynolds may refer to:

 Brian Reynolds (cricketer) (1932–2015), English professional cricketer
 Brian Reynolds (game designer) (born 1967), American strategy game designer
 Brian Reynolds (RAF officer) (1902–1965), British air marshal
 Brian Eddie Reynolds (born 1976), English lead vocalist and guitarist for Creation's Tears

See also
 Brian Reynolds Myers (born 1963), professor of international studies in South Korea
 Bryan Reynolds (disambiguation)